Bozhüyük is a village in the Adıyaman District, Adıyaman Province, Turkey. Its population is 326 (2021).

The hamlets of Bardakçı and Çekiçler are attached to the village.

References

Villages in Adıyaman District

Kurdish settlements in Adıyaman Province